Ogier the Dane is a legendary paladin of Charlemagne who appears in many Old French chansons de geste. In particular, he features as the protagonist in La Chevalerie Ogier (ca. 1220), which belongs to the Geste de Doon de Mayence ("cycle of the rebellious vassals"). The first part of this epic, the enfance[s] (childhood exploits) of Ogier, is marked by his duel against a Saracen from whom he obtains the sword Cortain, followed by victory over another Saracen opponent from whom he wins the horse Broiefort. In subsequent parts, Ogier turns into a rebel with cause, seeking refuge with the King of Lombardy and warring with Charlemagne for many years, until he is eventually reconciled when a dire need for him emerges after another Saracen incursion.

His character is a composite based on an historical Autcharius Francus who was aligned with king Desiderius of Lombardy against Charlemagne. The legend of a certain Othgerius buried in Meaux is also incorporated into the Chevalerie. 

In Scandinavia, he was first known as Oddgeir danski in the Old Norse prose translation Karlamagnús saga, but later became more widely known as Holger Danske, and was given the pedigree of being Olaf son of King Gøtrik in a 16th-century Danish translation. Since then, Holger Danske has become a Danish folklore hero, with a sleeping hero motif attached to him, and eventually a symbol of Danish identity and patriotism as well as anti-German nationalism.

Historical references 
The Ogier character is generally believed to be based on Autcharius (or Otkerus), a Frankish knight who had served Carloman and escorted his widow and young children to Desiderius, King of Lombardy, but eventually surrendered to Charlemagne. The Ogier character could also have been partly constructed from the historical Adalgis (or Algisus), son of Desiderius, who played a similar role. The chanson de geste does parallel this, and Ogier does seek refuge with the Lombardian king Didier or Désier (as Desiderius is styled in French).

An unrelated Othgerius (Otgerius), a benefactor buried at the Abbey of Saint Faro in Meaux in France, became connected with Ogier by a work called Conversio Othgeri militis (ca. 1070–1080) written by the monks there. This tradition is reflected in the chanson of Ogier, which states that the hero was buried at Meaux.

There is no Ogier of consequence in Danish history; at least, no Ogier as such appears in Saxo Grammaticus's Gesta Danorum. However, the Danish work Holger Danskes Krønike (1534) made Ogier into the son of King Gøtrek of Denmark (namely Olaf son of Gøtrek, mentioned by Saxo). "Olgerus, dux Daniæ" ("Olger, War-Leader of the Danes") had rebuilt the St. Martin's monastery pillaged by the Saxons in 778, according to the chronicle of this monastery at Cologne (ca. 1050). However, this is not a contemporary record and may just be poetic fiction.

The legend in France 
Ogier the Dane's first appearance (spelled Oger) in any work is in Chanson de Roland (c. 1060), where he is not named as one of the douzepers (twelve peers or paladins) of Charlemagne, although he is usually one of the twelve peers in other works. In the poeticized Battle of Roncevaux Pass, Ogier is assigned to be the vanguard and commands the Bavarian Army in the battle against Baligant in the later half. He plays only a minor part in this poem, and it is unclear what becomes of him, but the Pseudo-Turpin knows of a tradition that Ogier was killed at Roncevaux.

A full career of Ogier from youth to death is treated in La Chevalerie Ogier de Danemarche, a 13th-century assonanced poem of approximately 13,000 lines attributed to Raimbert de Paris. It relates Ogier's early years, his rebellion against Charlemagne and eventual reconciliation. This is now considered a retelling. Ogier in a lost original "Chevalerie Ogier primitive" is thought to have fought alongside the Lombards because Charlemagne attacked at the Pope's bidding, as historically happened in the Siege of Pavia (773–74), that is, there was no fighting with the Saracens (i.e. Muslims) as a prelude to this.

The legend that Ogier fought valiantly with some Saracens in his youth is the chief material of the first branch (about 3,000 lines) of Raimbert's Chevalerie Ogier. This is also recounted in Enfances Ogier (c. 1270), a rhymed poem of 9,229 lines by Adenet le Roi. The story of Ogier's youth develops with close similarity in these two works starting at the beginning, but they diverge at a certain point when Raimbert's version begins to be more economical with the details.

Ogier in versions of the Renaissance travels to the Avalon ruled by King Arthur and eventually becomes paramour of Morgan le Fay (the earliest known mention of her as his lover is in the 14th-century Brun de la Montaigne). This is how the story culminates in Roman d'Ogier, a reworking in s written in the 14th century, as well as its prose redaction retitled Ogier le Danois (Ogyer le Danois) printed in a number of editions from the late 15th century onwards. The Alexandrines version may contain some vestiges of the lost 12th-century Chevalerie Ogier. It is also possible that Ogier the Dane has first appeared in the Arthurian context as the Saxon prince Oriols the Dane (de Danemarche), sometimes known as the Red Knight, in the 13th-century Vulgate Merlin and its English adaptation Arthour and Merlin.

There are also several texts that might be classed as "histories" which refer to Ogier. Girart d'Amiens' Charlemagne contains a variant of Ogier's enfances. Jean d'Outremeuse's Ly Myreur des Histors writes of Ogier's combat with the capalus (chapalu). Philippe Mouskes's 13th-century Chronique rimée writes on Ogier's death.

Legend at Meaux 

A legend of Conversio Othgeri militis was invented by the monks at the abbey of Saint Faro at Meaux around 1070–1080. It claimed Othgerius Francus ("Frankish") to be the most illustrious member of Charlemagne's court after the king himself, thus making him identifiable with Ogier the Dane. He was buried in the abbey in a mausoleum built for him. His remains were placed in a sarcophagus lidded with his recumbent tomb effigy lying next to that of Saint Benedictus, and the chamber was enshrined with erect statues of various figures from the Charlemagne Cycle. A stone head later found in Meaux was determined to be Ogier's head from comparisons with these incunabula etchings. This stone head can still be viewed today.

This document was first commented on by Jean Mabillon in his Acta Sanctorum Ordinis S. Benedicti, printed editions of which include a detailed illustration of the mausoleum at St. Faro. The statues at the mausoleum even included la belle Aude, affianced to Roland, with one of the inscriptions there (according to Mabillon) claiming that Aude was Ogier's sister. It underwent restoration in 1535 by the Italian Gabriele Simeoni. That mausoleum is no longer preserved, but an illustration of the interior was printed in editions of Mabillon's Acta Sanctorum Ordinis S. Benedicti.

Chevalerie Ogier
Ogier is the main character in the poem La Chevalerie Ogier de Danemarche (written ca. 1200–1215). Here he is the son of Geoffroy de Danemarche given as a hostage to Charlemagne. Ogier's son is slain by Charlot, son of Charlemagne. Ogier attacks Charlot and demands his life in revenge, resulting in his banishment. Ogier wars with Charlemagne for seven years and survives prison for another seven years. They eventually make peace and Ogier goes to fight at Charlemagne's side against the Saracens, in which battle he slays the giant Brehus. The work consists of twelve parts (or "branches") of varying lengths.

Ogier, a condemned hostage, is initially an unarmed spectator when Charles (Charlemagne) fights Saracens in Italy at the Pope's request. But when the French suffer a setback, Ogier joins the fight, seizing a flag and arms from a fleeing standard-bearer, and is knighted by the king in gratitude. Next, Ogier accepts the challenge of single combat from the Saracen Karaheut, but enemies interrupt and abduct Ogier. Karaheut protests for Ogier's release, to no avail, and loses his engagement to the admiral's daughter. She now wishes to marry the newcomer on the battlefield, Brunamont of Maiolgre (Mallorca), but her wish will only be granted if a champion fights against Brunamont, and she names Ogier. Ogier, armed with Karaheut's sword Cortain (or Corte, Cortana, etc.), vanquishes Brunamont and wins the horse Broiefort.

Roman d'Ogier 

The 14th-century Roman d'Ogier is a refacimento in Alexandrines of 29,000 verses. In this version, Ogier is fated to be taken away by Morgan le Fay to Avalon and become her lover. This fate is set in motion while Ogier is still a newborn in his crib. Six fées visit the baby, each with a gift, and Morgan's gift is longevity and life living with her. Ogier has an enhanced career, even becoming King of England, and when he reaches the age of 100, he is shipwrecked by Morgan so he can be conveyed to Avalon. He returns after two hundred years to save France, and is given a firebrand which must not be allowed to be burnt down for him to remain alive. Ogier tries to forfeit his life after accomplishing his task but is saved by Morgan.

In this version of the legend, Ogier and Morgan have a son named Meurvin (or Marlyn). The latter himself became the subject of a lengthy Renaissance era romance, the Histoire du Preux et Vaillant Chevalier Meurvin (1540). Meurvin's story makes Ogier an ancestor of Godfrey of Bouillon, the historical crusader king of Jerusalem.

The legend in Scandinavia 
The early form of the chanson de geste was translated in the 13th century into Old Norse as Oddgeirs þáttr danska ("Short story of Oddgeir danski"), Branch III of the Karlamagnús saga. An Old Danish version of it, Karl Magnus krønike, was later created (some copies date to 1480).

The 16th-century Olger Danskes krønike was a Danish translation of the French prose romance Ogier le Danois by Kristiern Pedersen, started while in Paris in 1514–1515, probably completed during his second sojourn in 1527, and printed in 1534 in Malmö. Pedersen also fused the romance with Danish genealogy, thus making Ogier the son of Danish king Gøtrik (Godfred).

"Holger Danske og Burmand" (DgF 30, TSB E 133) recounts the fight between the hero and Burmand. The ballad also exists in Swedish (SMB 216) and tells the story of how Holger Dansk is released from prison to fight against a troll by the name of Burman.

The hero's popularity led to him being depicted on 15th- and 16th-century paintings in two churches in Denmark and Sweden. The Holger Danske and Burman painted on the ceiling of Floda Church in Sweden are attributed to Albertus Pictor around 1480. It also includes the text Holger Dane won victory over Burman; this is the burden of the Danish and Swedish ballad, but the painting predates other written texts for this ballad. On the slopes of Rönneberga outside Landskrona in south Sweden (formerly a part of Denmark), there is a burial mound named after Höljer (Holger) Danske.

In modern era 

Ogier in Danish legend is said to dwell in Kronborg Castle, his beard grown down to the floor. He will sleep there until some day when the country of Denmark is in the greatest peril, at which time he will awaken and save the nation. This is a common folklore motif, classed as Type 1960.2, "The King Asleep in the Mountain". According to the tour guides of Kronborg Castle, legend has it that Holger sat down in his present location after walking all the way from his completed battles in France. It was popularized by the short story "Holger Danske" written by Hans Christian Andersen in 1845.

The 1789 opera Holger Danske, composed by F.L.Æ. Kunzen with a libretto by Jens Baggesen, had a considerable impact on Danish nationalism in the late 18th century. It spawned the literary "Holger feud", which revealed the increasing dissatisfaction among the native Danish population with the German influence on Danish society. Danish intellectual Peter Andreas Heiberg joined the feud by writing a satirical version entitled Holger Tyske ("Holger the German") ridiculing Baggesen's lyrics. Ogier is also regarded as the symbol of national identity in Bernhard Severin Ingemann's 1837 epic poem Holger Danske. 

During the 1940-1945 German occupation of Denmark, a patriotic presentation of Kunzen's opera in Copenhagen became a manifestation of Danish national feeling and opposition to the occupation. The largest armed group of the Danish resistance movement in World War II, Holger Danske, was named after the legend.

The Hotel Marienlyst in Helsingør commissioned a statue of Holger Danske in 1907 from the sculptor Hans Peder Pedersen-Dan. The bronze statue was outside the hotel until 2013, when it was sold and moved to Skjern. The bronze statue was based on an original in plaster. The plaster statue was placed in the vaults at Kronborg Castle, also in Helsingør, where it became a popular attraction in its own right. The plaster statue was replaced by a concrete copy in 1985.

In Rudyard Kipling's poem "The Land" (1916), 'Ogier the Dane' is the archetypal name used to signify Danish invaders who have overrun Sussex. The protagonist of Poul Anderson's fantasy novel Three Hearts and Three Lions (1961), World War II Danish resistance member Holger Carlsen, time warps and learns that he actually is Ogier of the legend. Per Petterson's novel I Curse the River of Time (2001) has a ferry named Holger Danske. There is an Ogier story event in the strategy video game Crusader Kings II.

Explanatory notes

References 
Citations

Bibliography

(primary sources)
 Tome 1, Tome 2.

(secondary sources)
; 3rd ed., pp. 191–194, 291-337

External links 

Holger Danske at Den Store Danske Encyklopædi 

Chansons de geste
Characters in The Song of Roland
Legendary Danish people
Fictional knights
Matter of France
National personifications
King asleep in mountain